The 1922 Evansville Crimson Giants season was their second in the league. The team failed to improve on their previous output of 3–2, losing three games. They tied for fifteenth place in the league.

Schedule

Standings

References

Evansville Crimson Giants seasons
Evansville Crimson Giants
Evans
National Football League winless seasons